Giant herring is a common name for several fishes and may refer to:

Chanos chanos
Elops hawaiensis
Elops machnata
Elops saurus
Tenualosa toli